Zenta may refers to:
 Battle of Zenta, a battle on 11 September 1697 in which the Ottoman Empire suffered an ultimate defeat
 Senta, a municipality in  Vojvodina, Serbia, known as Zenta in other languages, from which the battle took its name
Martyrs of Zenta: Roman Catholic priests Pedro Ortiz de Zárate (1622–1683) and Giovanni Antonio Solinas (1643–1683)
 Zenta-class cruiser, class of warships of Austro-Hungarian Navy
 SMS Zenta, the lead ship of the class
Zenta Gastl-Kopp (born 1933), German hurdle runner
Zenta Mauriņa (1897–1978), Latvian writer